is a Japanese professional 9-dan Go player and journalist. As Go player, he was a pupil of So Kofuku. Since 2020 he has also worked as a journalist for Kahoku Shimpo.

Early life 

Ichiriki was born in 1997 in Sendai into a wealthy family which has run media companies.  His grandfather, Kazuo Ichiriki, then CEO of Kahoku Shimpo and Tohoku Broadcasting Company, was a big fan of Go and taught him playing Go. Ichiriki took Go lessons from other local amateur players too.  

Ichiriki went to Nihon Ki-in Go School as professional candidate from his childhood, first visited the school from Sendai, later from Tokyo. He moved to Tokyo with his mother in 2008.  

In Summer 2010 he was qualified as Go professional.

Go player 
In 2014, he won the 1st Globis Cup, an international U-20 tournament held annually in Japan.

He won his first title in a top-seven Japanese Go competition at the 45th Gosei in 2020, defeating Naoki Hane 3–0 in the title match.
The same year, he won the 46th Tengen title in a 3–2 victory over Yuta Iyama to take his second major title.

In 2021, he finished in the top four in the 9th Ing Cup, after being defeated by Xie Ke in the semifinal.

Journalist 
Alongside his professional Go career, Ichiriki enrolled in the Waseda University School of Social Sciences in 2016. He graduated in 2020 and began working at Kahoku Shimpo, his family's newspaper. He is a journalist at its Tokyo branch office. However, his main focus is still his career as a Go player.

References

External links
 Ichiriki Ryo on Go Ratings
 Nihon Ki-in profile (in Japanese)

Living people
1997 births
People from Sendai
Waseda University alumni
Japanese Go players
Japanese journalists